was a Japanese actor and voice actor. He was born in Chiyoda, Tokyo. He died in 1982 of diabetes mellitus. In later life, his hometown was Kanda, Tokyo.

Biography

Filmography

Films
 Harenchi Gakuen
 Lupin III: Strange Pychokinetic Strategy (Superintendent)

TV Drama
 I Am a Cat
 G-Men '75
 Shin Zatoichi
 Mito Kōmon
 Saiyuki II
 Hyokkori Hyoutanjima (Don Gervacio)

Anime
 Cyborg 009 1960s films (006/Chang Changku)
 Anderson Monogatari (Inspector)
 Nutcracker Fantasy (French Noble)

Other
 Appeared at the 16th and 24th Kōhaku Uta Gassen

External links
 

1934 births
1982 deaths
Japanese male voice actors
Male voice actors from Tokyo
People from Chiyoda, Tokyo
20th-century Japanese male actors